Fabrício Neis and David Vega Hernández were the defending champions but only Vega Hernández chose to defend his title, partnering Fernando Romboli. Vega Hernández lost in the quarterfinals to Eduard Esteve Lobato and Oriol Roca Batalla.

Tomislav Brkić and Ante Pavić won the title after defeating Ariel Behar and Andrey Golubev 7–6(7–2), 6–4 in the final.

Seeds

Draw

References

External links
 Main draw

Thindown Challenger Biella - Doubles